The Orta Mosque (from the Turkish, meaning "Middle Mosque") is a late 15th-century Ottoman mosque in the northern Greek city of Veria.

Description 
Built in 1490, the mosque is "one of the most notable specimens of Ottoman architecture" in the city. As its Turkish name indicates, it is in the centre of the city, between the Kentriki, Leonidou and Themistokleous streets. The entrance formerly featured an impressive portico with four marble pillars supporting four small arches, of which now only a ruined portion survives. The walls are built of large limestone blocks, but heavy use has also been made of marble spolia from Classical and Byzantine buildings; among the identifiable fragments are inscriptions in honour of Lucius Calpurnius Piso and emperor Nerva, from the local Temple of the Sebastoi.

The grouting of the building's external walls is used in decorative manner, protruding from the masonry. The minaret features a particularly striking decoration resembling lattice work. Wooden buildings were formerly joined to the building, as old photos and traces in the northeastern and southwestern corners attest. The mosque was declared a preserved monument in 1938, but has variously been used as a house, a musical instruments workshop and a stonemason’s workshop.

See also 
 List of former mosques in Greece
 List of mosques in Greece

References

Sources 

 

Buildings and structures completed in 1490
15th-century mosques
Ottoman mosques in Greece
Buildings and structures in Veria
15th-century architecture in Greece
Former mosques in Greece